Vacuolar protein-sorting-associated protein 36 is a protein that in humans is encoded by the VPS36 gene.

References

Further reading